Jane Leavy (born December 26, 1951) is an American sportswriter, biographer, and author who is formerly a beat reporter with The Washington Post. Leavy primarily writes about baseball and is best known for her best-selling biographies on baseball legends Sandy Koufax, Mickey Mantle, and Babe Ruth.

Personal Life and Career
Jane Leavy was born on December 26, 1951 in Roslyn, New York. Growing up, she was a New York Yankees fan. Leavy is an alumi of Roslyn High School. She graduated from Barnard College in 1974 and from the Columbia University School of Journalism in 1976. Leavy wrote her master's thesis on legendary sportswriter Red Smith, having decided to become a sportswriter like him while at Barnard. 

Before joining the The Washington Post, she was a staff writer at womenSports and Self magazines. She has written for many publications, including The New York Times, The New York Daily News, Newsweek, Sports Illustrated, and The Village Voice. Like many women sportswriters, Leavy encountered sexism and harassment while she was working. 

In 1990, Leavy wrote a comic, semi-autobiographical novel called Squeeze Play. Based around her own experiences and life, it follows a young woman who is the beat writer for the new (fictitious) Washington Senators baseball team. It was described by The Washington Post as a "bawdy baseball novel" and as "slapstick with the ring of truth". The novel was described by Entertainment Weekly as "the best novel ever written about baseball".

Leavy wrote her first best-selling baseball biography on the great Los Angeles Dodgers pitcher Sandy Koufax, called Sandy Koufax: A Lefty's Legacy, published by HarperCollins in 2002. The biography was significant as it was written with the somewhat reluctant approval of Koufax, who is famously private. While he did not sit down for an interview with her, he allowed her to talk to his friends and old teammates and also agreed to verify biographical facts.

In 2010, she wrote another best-selling baseball biography called The Last Boy: Mickey Mantle and the End of America's Childhood on her childhood hero, Mickey Mantle. It is an extensive chronicle of Mantle's off-field behavior, his alcoholism, and his difficult childhood and how all of it shaped his career. The book, published by HarperCollins, was based around a 1983 interviews she had with New York Yankees great.

Her third biography, The Big Fella: Babe Ruth and the World He Created, was published by HarperCollins in 2018. Unlike previous biographies on Babe Ruth, Leavy's book contains previously unknown details about his childhood. It also lays out how Ruth, with the help of his agent Christy Walsh, created his larger-than-life persona and became the first modern celebrity. It was named one of the top ten biographies/memoirs for the fall of 2018 by Publishers Weekly who described as an "entertaining and colorful biography".

Leavy primarily lives  in Washington, D.C. and Truro, Massachusetts. She has two children, Nick (born 1985) and Emma (born 1988) Isakoff.

Bibliography
 Squeeze Play (1990)
 Sandy Koufax: A Lefty's Legacy (2002)
 The Last Boy: Mickey Mantle and the End of America's Childhood (2010)
 The Big Fella: Babe Ruth and the World He Created (2018)

References 

Living people
1951 births
20th-century American biographers
21st-century American biographers
20th-century American Jews
21st-century American Jews
20th-century American novelists
21st-century American novelists
20th-century American women writers
21st-century American women writers
American sportswriters
American women novelists
American women biographers
American women sportswriters
American women journalists
Barnard College alumni
Columbia University Graduate School of Journalism alumni
Jewish American writers
Writers from New York (state)
People from Long Island
Women sportswriters